Margret Hafen (born 26 September 1946 in Oberstdorf) is a German former alpine skier who competed in the 1968 Winter Olympics.

External links
 sports-reference.com
 

1946 births
Living people
People from Oberstdorf
Sportspeople from Swabia (Bavaria)
Olympic alpine skiers of West Germany
Alpine skiers at the 1968 Winter Olympics
German female alpine skiers
20th-century German women